Uberlândia Esporte Clube, usually known simply as Uberlândia, is a Brazilian football team, from the city of Uberlândia, in Minas Gerais State. The club plays their home games at Estádio Parque do Sabiá. The club was founded in 1922. Their colors are green and white and their nicknames are "Verdão", "Furacão Verde da Mogiana ".

Titles
Campeonato Brasileiro Série B:
 Winners: 1984

Copa João Havelange – Módulos Verde e Branco:
 Runners-up: 2000

Campeonato Mineiro Second Level: 
 Winners (3): 1962, 1999, 2015

Taça Minas Gerais: 
 Winners (1): 2003

External links
 Uberlândia at Arquivo de Clubes

 
Association football clubs established in 1922
Football clubs in Minas Gerais
1922 establishments in Brazil